The Actors Company Theatre (TACT) is an Off-Broadway theatre company founded in 1992 by a group of New York stage veterans. For several years, TACT produced many concert performances, a cross between a staged reading and a full production. In 2006, TACT began a residency at the Beckett Theatre on Theatre Row to produce two full plays a year. TACT focuses on reviving lesser-known productions that have not been performed in New York for several years. According to their website, their mission statement is "to present neglected or rarely produced plays of literary merit, with a focus on creating theatre from its essence: the text and the actor's ability to bring it to life."

History 
The Actors Company Theatre was founded in 1992 by a group of actors. Beginning in the 2006–2007 season, TACT produced its Mainstage Off-Broadway productions in the Beckett Theatre. The following year, TACT became a resident company of NYC's Theatre Row. TACT also presented a Salon Series in a studio space at 900 Broadway.

For their Sixteenth Season, TACT followed the trajectory begun in 2006 and presented two more productions on their Mainstage at Theatre Row. TACT also ran a program for creating new works called "New Tactics." For all these productions, they commissioned original, incidental musical scores through their partnership with The Manhattan School of Music.

In January 2018, TACT announced that their 25th season would be their final season.

Past productions 
TACT has received notably positive reviews, particularly from the New York Times, for its productions of *Lovers * Lost in Yonkers Home and Eccentricities of a Nightingale.

Notable productions:
Lovers – Brian Friel
Lost in Yonkers – Neil Simon
Home – David Storey
The Sea – Edward Bond
The Runner Stumbles – Milan Stitt
Eccentricities of a Nightingale – Tennessee Williams
Bedroom Farce – Alan Ayckbourn
Incident At Vichy – Arthur Miller

Awards and nominations 
In 2012, TACT produced Neil Simon's Lost in Yonkers and Brian Friel's "Lovers" to critical and commercial success resulting in the Wall Street Journal naming TACT  "Company of the Year," saying "...Smart programming, superlative productions, a track record of consistent excellence: TACT is what off-Broadway ought to be." In addition, their production of Lost in Yonkers by Neil Simon brought TACT their first Drama Desk Award nomination, being nominated for Outstanding Revival of a Play. A list of reviews for TACT's other productions can be found on their website.

Members 
TACT's co-artistic directors are founding members Scott Alan Evans and actor Cynthia Harris, along with Jenn Thompson.

Company members include:

Cynthia Darlow – Actor
James Murtaugh – Actor
Joseph Trapanese – Composer
David Staller - Actor and Director
Jack Koenig - Actor

References

External links
TACT Official Website
The Actors Company Theatre Records, 1987-2018, held by the Billy Rose Theatre Division, New York Public Library for the Performing Arts

Hell's Kitchen, Manhattan
Off-Broadway theaters
Theatres in Manhattan
Performing groups established in 1992
1992 establishments in New York City
Defunct Theatre companies in New York City